William Shaw Richardson (December 22, 1919 – June 21, 2010) was an American attorney, political figure, and chief justice of the Hawaii State Supreme Court from 1966 to 1982. Prior to his service as the top jurist in Hawaii, Richardson was lieutenant governor under John A. Burns. Previous to that tenure from 1956 to 1962 he was chairman of the Democratic Party of Hawaii.

Early years
Richardson was born in Honolulu and was the son of Wilfred Kelelani Kānekoa Alapaʻi Richardson and Amy Lan Kyau Wung. He was of Chinese, Native Hawaiian, and Euro-American ancestry. His grandfather Colonel John Keone Likikine Richardson was a leading supporter of Queen Liliuokalani and the opposition to the overthrow of the Kingdom of Hawaii. Richardson referred to himself as "just a local boy from Hawaii."  He was a graduate of Roosevelt High School, University of Hawaii at Manoa, and University of Cincinnati College of Law.  Richardson served in World War II with the 1st Filipino Infantry Regiment as a platoon leader with a rank of Captain in the U.S. Army. After returning to Hawaii, he continued his military service in the Judge Advocate General Corps.

Political career
Richardson was the Chief Clerk for the Senate of the Territory of Hawaii during the 1955 and 1957 terms. He chaired the Democratic Party of Hawaii from 1956 until 1962 and oversaw its transition from a territorial to a state party. Richardson attended the 1956 and 1960  Democratic National Conventions as a delegate representing Hawaii. In 1962, he successfully ran for Lieutenant Governor of Hawaii as a Democrat. In March 1966, Governor John A. Burns nominated Richardson as the 16th Chief Justice of the Supreme Court of Hawaii. The Senate confirmed him, and Richardson served as the chief justice from 1966 until 1982.

Controversies
Richardson's tenure as chief justice of the Supreme Court of Hawaii was marked by landmark decisions that recognized the precedent of the state's unique cultural and legal history; specifically the public's interests in the environment, and the rights of the indigenous Hawaiian people.  Under Richardson, the court held that the public's interest in the natural environment may limit or prohibit commercial development of sensitive areas, particularly coastlines and beaches; that the public has right to access Hawaii's beaches, and that land created by lava flows belonged to the state, not to nearby property owners.  Richardson declared, "The western concept of exclusivity is not universally applicable in Hawaii."  When two sugarcane plantations each sought the right to a water source, Richardson cited precedent from the court of the Kingdom of Hawai'i, and declared that the water belonged to neither of them, but to the state. The Richardson court recognized previously ignored claims of the indigenous Hawaiian people.

Kamehameha Schools Bishop Estate
After retiring from the Chief Justice position, the Hawaii State Supreme Court appointed Richardson as a trustee of the Kamehameha Schools Bishop Estate, a position he held from 1983 until 1992.

Legacy
Before his retirement from the bar, Richardson was honored with the naming of the state's only law school in his honor.  The William S. Richardson School of Law was his crowning achievement, as he fought for its establishment for decades.  Richardson, who is fondly referred to as "CJ" (for Chief Justice), was still involved with the development of the law school and regularly attended school functions up until his death in June 2010.

See also 
 List of minority governors and lieutenant governors in the United States

References

External links

1919 births
2010 deaths
Hawaii Democrats
Lieutenant Governors of Hawaii
Chief Justices of the Hawaii Supreme Court
American jurists of Chinese descent
Native Hawaiian people
University of Cincinnati College of Law alumni
University of Hawaiʻi alumni
United States Army personnel of World War II
Politicians from Honolulu
President Theodore Roosevelt High School alumni
20th-century American politicians
20th-century American judges
Hawaii people of Chinese descent
Hawaii politicians of Chinese descent
United States Army officers
United States Army Judge Advocate General's Corps